Willy Prager (23 May 1877 – 4 March 1956) was a German actor, writer and Kabarett performer.

Filmography

Bibliography
 Jelavich, Peter. Berlin Cabaret. Harvard University Press, 1996.

External links

1877 births
1956 deaths
German male stage actors
German male film actors
German male silent film actors
German theatre directors
People from Katowice
People from the Province of Silesia
20th-century German male actors